Jimmy Santiago Montenegro Narváez (born 15 May 1998) is an Ecuadorian road cyclist, who currently rides for UCI Continental team . 

He won the Under-23 road race at the 2019 Pan American Championships held in Lima, Peru. In July 2021, he was confirmed to be on the Ecuadorian team for the time trial at the 2020 Summer Olympics.

Major results

2017
 1st  Road race, National Under-23 Road Championships
2018
 5th Time trial, National Road Championships
2019
 1st  Road race, Pan American Under-23 Road Championships
 National Under-23 Road Championships
2nd Road race
3rd Time trial
 3rd Overall Tour de l'Espoir
 5th Overall Vuelta a Miranda
1st Mountains classification
 9th Overall Vuelta a Venezuela
2020
 1st  Overall Vuelta al Ecuador
1st  Young rider classification
2021
 1st Stage 4 Vuelta al Ecuador
2022
 1st  Mountains classification, Vuelta a Colombia
 3rd Overall Vuelta al Ecuador
1st Mountains classification
1st Stages 1, 6 & 8
 3rd Overall Vuelta a Guatemala
1st Stage 7
 4th Time trial, National Road Championships
 Pan American Road Championships
7th Road race
7th Time trial

References

External links

1998 births
Living people
Ecuadorian male cyclists
Pan American Games competitors for Ecuador
Cyclists at the 2019 Pan American Games
21st-century Ecuadorian people